Jeremy Kushnier (born September 30, 1975) is a Canadian actor, singer and songwriter.

Early life
Jeremy Kushnier was born in Winnipeg, Manitoba, Canada. Kushnier attended Miles MacDonell Collegiate, the Winnipeg School of Performing Arts, and the Royal Winnipeg Ballet, all in Winnipeg. He is the brother of the actor Serge Kushnier and the musician Bryce Kushnier, involved with the electronic project Vitaminsforyou.

Kushnier travelled by bus from Toronto to New York City to audition for a role in Footloose in 1997.

Life and career
Kushnier is known for originating the role of Ren McCormick in the musical rendition of Footloose, and for his role in the Tony Award-winning musical Jersey Boys in the role of Tommy Devito and was one of the "Top 10 Great Chicago Performances of 2007". He starred in the Chicago cast, and then opened the Vegas production. He took over the role of Tommy on August 21, 2008 as part of the Toronto engagement of Jersey Boys, which was part of the North American tour. He played Dr. Madden/Dr. Fine in the first national tour of the Pulitzer Prize winning musical Next to Normal.

In the Broadway revival of Jesus Christ Superstar, he played a priest and understudied the roles of Judas, Jesus and Pilate.

He also performed on Broadway in the Cirque du Soleil show Paramour.  Kushnier replaced actor Bradley Dean in 2016 in Paramour because of creative differences. [ He also originated the role of Bausilius in Head Over Heels in 2018.

He is married to Jenny Lee Stern.

Broadway actor

Footloose
Original, musical
Starring: Jeremy Kushnier [Ren McCormack] (October 22, 1997 – July 2, 2000).

Rent
Original, musical, drama
Starring: Jeremy Kushnier [Roger Davis] — Replacement (November 17, 2003 – January 17, 2005).

Theatre credits
(1988) Played Oliver in "Oliver!" at Rainbow Stage, Winnipeg Manitoba
(1990) Performed in Say It With Music at Rainbow Stage, Winnipeg Manitoba
(1995) Cast in the Toronto production of The Who's Tommy; later toured Canada
Performed as a swing in the Canadian production of Rent
(2000) Cast as one of the leads in The Rhythm Club; premiered at The Signature Theater in Arlington, Virginia
(2001) Played Roger in the Benny Tour production of Rent
(2002–2003) Playing Radames in the national tour of Disney's Aida
Appeared in the workshops of the stage musicals "Summer of '42" and "Joe: The Musical"
Appeared in the Readings for Hamlet — The Musical, ROOMS,  and Drift
Appeared in American Duet featuring Darius Rucker of Hootie and the Blowfish, in February 2004.
(2005) Played Judas in Jesus Christ Superstar at the Kansas City Starlight Theatre.
(2006) Played Roger in World Tour of Rent.
(2006) Played Jerry in Full Monty at Maine State Music Theater
(2007) Played Jamie in Bright Lights, Big City.
(2008) Stars in the hit play, Jersey Boys, as Tommy DeVito in the LaSalle Theatre in Chicago
(2010) Played Freddie Trumper in Signature Theatre's production of Chess 
(2010–2011) Starred as Dr. Fine/Dr. Madden in the first national tour of Next to Normal
(2012) Played a priest and understudied Jesus, Judas and Pontius Pilate on Broadway in Jesus Christ Superstar
(2016) Played the 'Hollywood Wiz' (A.J.) in "Paramour."
(2018) Played Basilius in "Head Over Heels."

Music
Jeremy Kushnier's first CD, In Time (2002), is a celebration of relationships, life and love. Growing up, Jeremy's influences ranged from The Beatles to Billy Joel. Loving the singer/song writer genre he quickly developed his own style of writing, ranging from light ballads to edgy rock and roll.
Angel light
Randi
The ride's on me
Brooklyn baby
Your little tragedy
In time
Back away
Feminenemy
Here for you
The smile in her eyes

Kushnier's second album "Jeremy Kushnier" in 2006 (produced by Jonathan Dinklage) is a more grounded look at life through clearer glasses. This EP conceived and produced with his friend and musical director Jonathan Dinklage is an acoustic blend of rock and pop that gleans its inspiration from an era of analog tape and tube warmth. A time when one good take could make an album. This album was recorded with a group of musicians with the feel and talent to pull this inspiration together in a truly creative and original way. There is an honesty in this recording that keeps it grounded without taking itself too seriously. Jeremy's writing continues to fuse his love of singer songwriters with his self-proclaimed pop addiction. From the moody Allison to the B52's-esque Lullaby this follow up to his first release "In Time" is sure to leave you wanting more.
Why
Lullaby
Allison
The one about Drew
Stars

Soundtrack:
"One Tree Hill" (one episode, 2006)
Can't Stop This Thing We've Started (2006) TV episode (performer: "Allison")

Movies
Actor:
The Adulterer (2000) .... Aaron

References

External links

Jeremy Kushnier website

Jeremy Kushnier at Internet Off-Broadway Database

1975 births
Living people
Canadian male film actors
Traditional pop music singers
Canadian expatriate male actors in the United States
Male actors from Winnipeg
Musicians from Winnipeg
21st-century Canadian male singers